Madora Bay is a suburb of the City of Mandurah.

History
First named in 1960 as Madora Beach Estate, the name was derived from the Kimberley pastoral station of Mandora and a former railway siding near Dwellingup known as Chadora. The suburb was gazetted in 1990 as Madora but was later amended to its current name in 2003.

After Madora Beach Road was constructed in 1959, only four roads connected to the area: Sabina Drive, Challenger Road, Albion Road and Madora Beach Road. Back then, lot prices were between £250 and £525 for the best lotswhich were on Sabina Drive facing the beach front. Interested buyers were able to pay £5 to secure a lot, and then pay up to 84 monthly payments. Buyers also had to secure their own water via rain tanks and wells; sewerage was disposed of through septic tanks. It wasn't until around two years later that the State Electricity Commission supplied power to Madora Bay.

Over subsequent years, the estate changed in various ways, the biggest possibly being the change of name from Madora Beach to Madora Bay in 1970; this was done through a marketing perspective as the name seemed more appealing to tourists. Madora Bay has now been subdivided into 650 lots and in 2002, development commenced to add another 400 lots to the suburb.

Geography 
Madora Bay is the northernmost suburb of Mandurah and can be located on the coast between Mandurah and Rockingham.

Demographics 
According to a census, carried out in 2011, the population of Madora Bay is 1,721 people; the median age for these people is 39 years of age. The majority of these people were born in Australia, but are descendants of their English ancestors. As of 2011, the median individual income was $660.00 per week, whilst the median family income was $1,815 per week.

References

Suburbs of Mandurah